Gilles Plains  is a suburb of the greater Adelaide, South Australia area, approximately 10km north-east of the Adelaide central business district.

History
It is named after the first Colonial Treasurer Osmond Gilles who owned a sheep station adjoining the Torrens River. Gilles Plains was predominantly a hay growing area of Adelaide through its early years. In 1874, it had the largest hay farm in South Australia owned by J. A. W. Sudholz.

Government
Gilles Plains is in both the City of Port Adelaide Enfield and City of Tea Tree Gully local government areas, and is in both the South Australian House of Assembly electoral districts of Florey and Torrens. It is also in the Australian House of Representatives Division of Sturt.

Schools
Pinnacle College is on Wandana Avenue. St Pauls College is on Grand Junction Road. Wandana Primary School is on Cowra Avenue.

Gallery

References